Maximilian von Mexiko is a 1970 German-Austrian historical television miniseries depicting the events of the French Intervention in Mexico which placed Emperor Maximilian on the throne of Mexico. It consisted of two parts totalling 185 minutes.

Cast
 Michael Heltau as Maximilian
 Christine Wodetzky as Charlotte
 Siegfried Wischnewski as Napoleon III
 Katharina Matz as Kaiserin Eugenie
 Albert Rueprecht as Kaiser Franz Joseph
 Kurd Pieritz as Graf Rechberg
 Hans Paetsch as Pope Pius IX
 Richard Münch as Cardinal
 Wolfgang Borchert as Bischof Pereda
 Walter Klam as Herzog von Morny
 Alexander Hegarth as Graf von Saligny
 O.A. Buck as Graf Drouyn De Lhuys
 Kurt A. Jung as Graf D'Arcy
 Herbert Fleischmann as Sir Charles Wyke
 Heinz Spitzner as Lord Russel
 Herbert Steinmetz as Seward
 Horst Beck as Bankier Jecker
 Charles Brauer as Hidalgo
 Wolfgang Weiser as Gutierrez
 Friedrich Schütter as Almonte
 Josef Dahmen as General Bazaine
 Kurt Schmitt-Mainz as General Graf Prim
 Karl-Heinz Kreienbaum as Steinsen
 Peter Maertens as General Miramon
 Uwe Friedrichsen as General Mejia
 Wolfgang Rau as General Marques
 Fritz von Friedl as Dr. Basch
 Norbert Skalden as Prinz Salm
 Petra Mood as Prinzessin Salm
 Dieter Borsche as Benito Juárez
 Hans Schellbach as General Escobedo
 Rolf Schimpf as Oberst Vilianueva
 Christian Claaszen as Oberst Lopez
 Manfred Reddemann as Peter Corona

External links

 Maximilian von Mexiko at krimiserien.heimat.eu

1970 television films
1970 films
1970s German television miniseries
Austrian television miniseries
1970s Austrian television series
Television series set in the 1860s
Television shows set in Mexico
1970 German television series debuts
1970 German television series endings
Television series based on actual events
1970s German-language films
German-language television shows
Films directed by Günter Gräwert
Second French intervention in Mexico films
ZDF original programming
Cultural depictions of Napoleon III
Cultural depictions of Franz Joseph I of Austria